{{Infobox writer
|name        = Abi Morgan
|honorific_suffix = 
|image       = 
|caption     = 
|birth_name  = Abigail Louise Morgan
|birth_date  = 
|birth_place = Cardiff, Wales
|occupation  = Screenwriter
|period      = 1998–present
|genre       = Drama
|notableworks = Sex Traffic, Brick Lane, The Hour, The Iron Lady, Shame, Suffragette
|spouse      = Jacob Krichefski
|children    = 2
|influences  = 
|influenced  = 
}}

Abigail Louise Morgan  (born 1968) is a Welsh playwright and screenwriter known for her works for television, such as Sex Traffic and The Hour, and the films Brick Lane, The Iron Lady, Shame and Suffragette.

Early life
Abigail Louise Morgan was born in Cardiff, Wales, in 1968. She is the daughter of actress Pat England and theatre director Gareth Morgan, who was director of the Gulbenkian Theatre in Newcastle upon Tyne (now the Northern Stage). Her parents divorced when she was a teenager and her childhood was spent moving around the country while her mother acted in repertory theatre; she told The Scotsman in 2010 that she had attended seven separate schools during her childhood. Her sister is the fundraiser at London's Unicorn Theatre.

After initial ambitions to become an actress herself, she decided to become a writer while reading drama and literature at Exeter University. She then took a postgraduate writing course at the Central School of Speech and Drama.

Writing career

Theatre
Having not dared to show any of her writing "to anyone for five years", her first professional stage credit was in 1998 with Skinned at the Nuffield Theatre, Southampton. She has written plays for the Royal Exchange Studio Theatre Manchester, the Royal Lyceum Theatre, the Traverse Theatre, Edinburgh, the National Theatre of Scotland and the Royal Court, London. Her 2001 play Tender commissioned by Birmingham Rep Theatre and co-produced with the Hampstead Theatre gained her a nomination as "most promising playwright" at the 2002 Laurence Olivier Theatre Awards.

Television
Morgan gained her first television writing credit in 1998 on the continuing ITV drama series Peak Practice, following that with a television play My Fragile Heart (2000) and a BBC2 drama Murder in 2002, starring Julie Walters.

She was commissioned to write the single drama Sex Traffic for Channel 4 in 2004, about a teenage girl trafficked from the Balkans to Britain. This drama, directed by David Yates, won the 2005 BAFTA award for Best Drama Serial. She has since written a number of single dramas for television including Tsunami: The Aftermath (2006), White Girl, part of White (2008) and Royal Wedding (2010), which follows the 1981 Royal Wedding through the perspective of events held in a small Welsh mining village. Her television work also includes writing Birdsong, a two-part television adaptation of Sebastian Faulks's novel of the same title.

Morgan's first continuing drama series was The Hour (2011), set in a BBC newsroom during the 1956 Suez Crisis. It was commissioned for a second series, but cancelled after the second series was transmitted, its ratings having been one quarter lower than the first. In 2013, she won the Primetime Emmy Award for Outstanding Writing for a Miniseries, Movie, or Dramatic Special for The Hour, having also been nominated in 2012.

Morgan wrote the legal drama The Split, about the private and professional lives of divorce lawyers, first shown on BBC1 in April 2018.

Film
Morgan has also written for cinema: her 2007 adaptation of Monica Ali's novel Brick Lane was critically acclaimed, but created controversy – some Brick Lane Bengalis labelled the film "defamatory" and a planned royal film performance was cancelled. Her next film was The Iron Lady, which starred Meryl Streep as Margaret Thatcher, closely followed by a smaller-budget production, Shame, co-written with Steve McQueen. Her work on The Iron Lady earned her a BAFTA Award for Best Original Screenplay nomination, while her work on Shame earned her a BAFTA Award for Outstanding British Film nomination. She has said that she always puts one line from her last film in her next film.

Her next film, The Invisible Woman, was an adaptation of the book of the same name by Claire Tomalin, about the secret love affair between Charles Dickens and Nelly Ternan, which lasted for thirteen years until his death in 1870. The film was released to critical acclaim in 2013, but its production was reportedly strained after clashes between lead actress Kristin Scott Thomas and Morgan on set, the source of which was never disclosed.

A staunch opponent of Brexit, Morgan was one of nine leading playwrights to contribute to a series of online dramas in 2017 responding to the causes and consequences of the EU referendum result. Entitled Brexit Shorts, Morgan's monologue, The End, starred Penelope Wilton as a woman on the brink as she faces the consequences of the end of her 43-year-old marriage.

Non Fiction
In May 2022, Morgan released a memoir entitled This Is Not a Pity Memoir, in which she discusses her husband's battle with encephalitis and Capgras delusion.

Personal life
Morgan lives in the north London neighbourhood of Stroud Green in Haringey, with her husband, actor Jacob Krichefski, and their two children. They married in June 2021. Krichefski has multiple sclerosis and developed anti-NMDA receptor encephalitis in 2018 after participating in a clinical trial; after six months in a medically-induced coma he had Capgras delusion and could not recognise Morgan. She wrote a memoir, This Is Not a Pity Memoir, describing these experiences.

In January 2020, Morgan said that she was recovering from breast cancer. She had chemotherapy and a mastectomy.

Morgan was appointed OBE in the 2018 Birthday Honours, "For services to Theatre and Screenwriting".

Selected works

PlaysSkinned (1997)Sleeping Around (1998) – co-written with Mark Ravenhill, Stephen Greenhorn and Hilary Fannin Fast Food (1999)Splendour (2000)Tiny Dynamite (2001)Tender (2001)Monster Mum (2005)Fugee (2008)Chain Play – Production II – co-written with Neil LaBute, Mike Poulton and Tanya Ronder The Night is Darkest Before the Dawn (2009), as part of The Great Game: AfghanistanLovesong (2011)27 (2011)The Mistress Contract (2014)The End (2017)

Film screenplaysBrick Lane (2007)The Iron Lady (2011)Shame (2011)The Invisible Woman (2013)Suffragette (2015)

TV screenplaysMy Fragile Heart (2000)Murder (2002) Sex Traffic (2004)Tsunami: The Aftermath (2006)White Girl, part of White (2008) – with Hettie Macdonald, won the TV Spielfilm Award at the Cologne ConferenceRoyal Wedding (2010)The Hour (2011)Birdsong (2012)River (2015)The Split'' (2018, 2020, 2022)

Books

References

External links
 
 Theatre credits
 The Guardian

Living people
1968 births
British dramatists and playwrights
Alumni of the University of Exeter
British women dramatists and playwrights
British women screenwriters
Primetime Emmy Award winners
Writers from Cardiff